Steve Chainel (born 6 September 1983 in Remiremont) is a French racing cyclist, who currently rides for UCI Cyclo-cross Pro Team Cross Team Legendre.

Subsequently,  announced that they had signed Chainel for 2015.

Major results

Cyclo-cross

1999–2000
 1st  National Junior Championships
2003–2004
 3rd  UEC European Under-23 Championships
2004–2005
 2nd National Under-23 Championships
2005–2006
 1st Int. Radquerfeldein
 2nd Frankfurter Rad-Cross
 2nd Challenge de la France Cycliste 1
 2nd Challenge de la France Cycliste 2
 4th UCI World Championships
2006–2007
 1st  Cyclo-cross International de Marle
 1st Int. Radquerfeldein
 2nd Frankfurter Rad-Cross
 3rd Challenge de la France Cycliste 2
 3rd Intern. Radquer Hittnau
2007–2008
 1st Grand Prix Hotel Threeland
 2nd Cyclo-cross International de Marle
 2nd Challenge de la France Cycliste 1
2008–2009
 1st Grand Prix Hotel Threeland
 1st Grand Prix de la Commune de Niederanven
 2nd National Championships
 2nd Challenge de la France Cycliste de Cyclo-cross 1
 2nd Challenge de la France Cycliste de Cyclo-cross 2
 9th UCI World Championships
2009–2010
 1st Grand Prix Wetzikon
 1st Grand Prix Hotel Threeland
 2nd National Championships
 2nd Challenge de la France Cycliste de Cyclo-cross 2
 3rd Challenge de la France Cycliste de Cyclo-cross 1
 3rd Cyclo-cross International de Marle
2010–2011
 Challenge la France de cyclo-cross
1st Saverne
3rd Saint-Jean-De-Monts
3rd Miramas
 1st GP de la Commune de Contern
 2nd Grand Prix Hotel Threeland
 3rd Velka Cena Mesta Tabora
2011–2012
 2nd National Championships
 2nd Cyclo-cross Nommay
 2nd Cyclo-cross International de Marle
 Challenge la France de cyclo-cross
2nd Besançon
2013–2014
 2nd Challenge National 1ère Epreuve Saint-Etienne-lès-Remiremont
2014–2015
 3rd QianSen Trophy Cyclocross Yanqing Station
2015–2016
 Coupe de France de cyclo-cross
2nd Flamanville
 2nd GGEW Grand Prix
 2nd GP-5-Sterne-Region
 2nd Qiansen Trophy Cyclocross Yanqing Station
 3rd Grand-Prix de la Commune de Contern
 3rd Qiansen Trophy Cyclocross Qiongzhong Station
2016–2017
 1st Trek CXC Cup
 2nd Val d'Ille Intermarché Cyclo-cross Tour
 EKZ CrossTour
2nd Aigle
 4th Overall Coupe de France de cyclo-cross
3rd Erôme Gervans
2017–2018
 1st  National Championships
 2nd Overall Coupe de France de cyclo-cross
1st Besançon
2nd Flamanville
3rd Jablines
3rd La Mézière
 2nd Jingle Cross 2
 10th UCI World Championships
2018–2019
 1st Utsunomiya Cyclo Cross Day 1
 2nd Utsunomiya Cyclo Cross Day 2
 3rd Cyclo-cross International de la Solidarite
 4th Overall Coupe de France de cyclo-cross
3rd Flamanville
 4th Overall EKZ CrossTour
2019–2020
 2nd Overall Coupe de France de cyclo-cross
1st Andrezieux-Boutheon
2nd La Meziere
 2nd Jingle Cross 1
 2nd Grand Prix Topolcianky
 2nd Grand Prix Podbrezová
 3rd Cyclo cross du Mingant Lanarvily
2020–2021
 1st Stockholm cyclocross

Road

2005
 10th Paris–Mantes-en-Yvelines
2006
 1st Nancray
2007
 5th Paris–Mantes-en-Yvelines
 7th Trophée des Grimpeurs
2008
 1st Overall Circuit de Lorraine
1st Stage 4
 2nd Trophée des Grimpeurs
 2nd Châteauroux Classic
2009
 9th Overall Three Days of De Panne
2010
 1st Stage 1 Three Days of De Panne
 4th Dwars door Vlaanderen
2011
 4th Tro-Bro Léon
 5th Paris–Troyes
 6th Grand Prix de la Ville de Lillers
2012
 8th Gent–Wevelgem
2014
 6th Le Samyn
2015
 6th Le Samyn

Grand Tour general classification results timeline

References

External links

 
 
 

1983 births
Living people
French male cyclists
Cyclo-cross cyclists
People from Remiremont
Sportspeople from Vosges (department)
Cyclists from Grand Est